Carolin Babcock Stark (née Babcock; May 26, 1912 – March 25, 1987) was a tennis player from the United States. She won the women's doubles title with Marjorie Van Ryn at the 1936 U.S. Championships. Babcock was the runner-up in singles at the 1932 U.S. Championships, losing to Helen Hull Jacobs in straight sets. Stark also was the runner-up in women's doubles at the 1934, 1935, and 1937 editions of that tournament.

According to A. Wallis Myers of The Daily Telegraph and the Daily Mail, Babcock was ranked in the world top 10 in 1934 and 1936, both years being ranked World No. 10. She was included in the year-end top ten rankings issued by the United States Tennis Association from 1932 through 1937. She was the third-ranked U.S. player in 1932 and 1934.

Babcock was born in Billings, Montana and graduated from the Marlborough School in Los Angeles in 1934. In 1937, she married Richard Salisbury Stark. She died aged 74 at Southampton (Long Island) Hospital, New York, two days after suffering a stroke at her home in the North Haven section of Sag Harbor.

Grand Slam finals

Singles (1 runner-up)

Doubles (1 title, 3 runner-ups)

Grand Slam singles tournament timeline

See also 
 Performance timelines for all female tennis players who reached at least one Grand Slam final

References

American female tennis players
Tennis players from Los Angeles
Sportspeople from Billings, Montana
Tennis people from Montana
United States National champions (tennis)
1912 births
1987 deaths
Grand Slam (tennis) champions in women's doubles
20th-century American women